Wilbert Miguel Hernández Torrealba (born 2 March 2001) is a Venezuelan footballer who plays as a goalkeeper for Caracas.

Career statistics

Club

Notes

References

2001 births
Living people
Venezuelan footballers
Association football goalkeepers
Caracas FC players
Venezuelan Primera División players